Neuroxena obscurascens is a moth of the  subfamily Arctiinae. It is found in Cameroon, Nigeria and South Africa.

References

 Natural History Museum Lepidoptera generic names catalog

Nyctemerina